István Klimek (also written as Stefan Climek; 15 April 1913 – 12 November 1988), was a Romanian international footballer of Hungarian origin who played as a striker.

Biography 

While playing for the Romanian club ILSA Timişoara, he was selected to play for the Romania national football team by joint coaches Josef Uridil and Costel Rădulescu to play at the 1934 World Cup in Italy. The team were eliminated in the first round by Czechoslovakia, losing 2–1.

Honours
ILSA Timișoara
Liga II (1): 1935–36

Notes and references

External links 

1913 births
1988 deaths
Romania international footballers
Romanian footballers
Liga I players
Liga II players
1934 FIFA World Cup players
Romanian sportspeople of Hungarian descent
Association football forwards
CA Timișoara players